Churtan is a rural locality (a settlement) in Seyvinskoye Rural Settlement, Gaynsky District, Perm Krai, Russia. The population was 195 as of 2010. There are 4 streets.

Geography 
Churtan is located 46 km southwest of Gayny (the district's administrative centre) by road. Seyva is the nearest rural locality.

References 

Rural localities in Gaynsky District